Tennenbaum's theorem, named for Stanley Tennenbaum who presented the theorem in 1959, is a result in mathematical logic that states that no countable nonstandard model of first-order Peano arithmetic (PA) can be recursive (Kaye 1991:153ff).

Recursive structures for PA
 
Because the isomorphism must be a bijection, every recursive model is countable. There are many nonisomorphic countable nonstandard models of PA.

Statement of the theorem 
Tennenbaum's theorem states that no countable nonstandard model of PA is recursive. Moreover, neither the addition nor the multiplication of such a model can be recursive.

Proof sketch

This sketch follows the argument presented by Kaye (1991).   The first step in the proof is to show that, if M is any countable nonstandard model of PA, then the standard system of M (defined below) contains at least one nonrecursive set S.  The second step is to show that, if either the addition or multiplication operation on M were recursive, then this set S would be recursive, which is a contradiction. 

Through the methods used to code ordered tuples, each element  can be viewed as a code for a set  of elements of M. In particular, if we let  be the ith prime in M, then . Each set  will be bounded in M, but if x is nonstandard then the set  may contain infinitely many standard natural numbers. The standard system of the model is the collection . It can be shown that the standard system of any nonstandard model of PA contains a nonrecursive set, either by appealing to the incompleteness theorem or by directly considering a pair of recursively inseparable r.e. sets (Kaye 1991:154).

For the latter construction, begin with a pair of recursively inseparable r.e. sets A and B.  For natural number x there is a y such that, for all i < x, if  then  and if  then .

Hence S is a separating set for A and B, and by the choice of A and B this means S is nonrecursive. 

Now, to prove Tennenbaum's theorem, begin with a nonstandard countable model M and an element a in M so that  is nonrecursive. The proof method shows that, because of the way the standard system is defined, it is possible to compute the characteristic function of the set S using the addition function  of M as an oracle. Then, search for an element y of M so that 

This search will halt because the Euclidean algorithm can be applied to any model of PA. Finally, we have  if and only if the i found in the search was 0. Because S is not recursive, this means that the addition operation on M is nonrecursive. 

A similar argument shows that it is possible to compute the characteristic function of S using the multiplication of M as an oracle, so the multiplication operation on M is also nonrecursive (Kaye 1991:154).

References

 
 
 
 

Model theory
Theorems in the foundations of mathematics